This is a list of episodes for the television series The Cisco Kid.

Series overview

Episodes

Season 1 (1950–51)

Season 2 (1951–52)

Season 3 (1952–53)

Season 4 (1953–54)

Season 5 (1954–55)

Season 6 (1955–56)

Home releases
At present, the following DVD sets — each of which consists of a selection of random episodes, rather than a whole season — have been released by MPI Home Video.

References

External links
 
 

Lists of American Western (genre) television series episodes